Wasik or Wąsik is a surname. Notable people with the surname include:

Bill Wasik, American magazine editor
Elżbieta Magdalena Wąsik (born 1961), Polish linguist
Zdzisław Wąsik (born 1947), Polish linguist and semiotician

Polish-language surnames